Lepsimandus or Lepsimandos was a city of ancient Caria, mentioned by Stephanus of Byzantium. Lepsimandus was located on an island of the same name in the Aegean Sea. Lepsimandus was a polis (city-state) and member of the Delian League. It appears in the Athenian tribute lists and paid an annual tribute of 17 drachmae, 1 obol.
 
Its site is located on Kalolimnos.

References

Populated places in ancient Caria
Populated places in the ancient Aegean islands
Former populated places in Greece
Members of the Delian League
Greek city-states